Pierce is a town in Kewaunee County, Wisconsin, United States. The population was 833 at the 2010 census. The unincorporated communities of Alaska and Rostok are in the town.

Geography
Pierce is in eastern Kewaunee County and is bordered by the city of Algoma to the north, Kewaunee to the south, and Lake Michigan to the east.

Demographics
At the 2000 census there were 897 people, 329 households, and 261 families in the town. The population density was 48.3 people per square mile (18.6/km).  There were 407 housing units at an average density of 21.9 per square mile (8.5/km).  The racial makeup of the town was 98.10% White, 0.11% African American, 1.00% Native American, 0.11% Asian, 0.22% from other races, and 0.45% from two or more races. Hispanic or Latino of any race were 1.00%.

Of the 329 households 33.4% had children under the age of 18 living with them, 67.5% were married couples living together, 7.6% had a female householder with no husband present, and 20.4% were non-families. 16.7% of households were one person and 5.2% were one person aged 65 or older. The average household size was 2.72 and the average family size was 3.05.

The age distribution was 27.6% under the age of 18, 5.7% from 18 to 24, 26.9% from 25 to 44, 29.4% from 45 to 64, and 10.4% 65 or older. The median age was 38 years. For every 100 females, there were 108.1 males. For every 100 females age 18 and over, there were 109.4 males.

The median household income was $43,000 and the median family income  was $46,364. Males had a median income of $31,667 versus $23,750 for females. The per capita income for the town was $18,384. About 10.9% of families and 15.2% of the population were below the poverty line, including 26.1% of those under age 18 and 2.2% of those age 65 or over.

Highway 42 in Pierce

References

External links
Official website

Towns in Kewaunee County, Wisconsin
Green Bay metropolitan area
Towns in Wisconsin